The imitation of natural sounds in various cultures is a diverse phenomenon and can fill in various functions. In several instances, it is related to the belief system (yoiks of the Sami, some other shamanic songs and rituals, overtone singing of some cultures). It may serve also such practical goals as luring in the hunt; or entertainment (katajjaqs of Inuit).

Among some peoples of the Altai-Sayan region, including Tofa, the ability to mimic sounds of the environment includes hunting calls, and is present also in a traditional singing tradition preserved only by some old people.

Fields

Shamanism 

Shamanism in various cultures shows great diversity. In some cultures, the music or songs related to shamanistic practice may mimic natural sounds, sometimes with onomatopoeia.

Entertainment 

The intention to mimic natural sounds is not necessarily linked to shamanistic beliefs or practice alone. Katajjaq (a "genre" of music of some Inuit groups) is a game played by women, for entertainment. In some instances, natural sounds (mostly those of animals, e.g. geese) are imitated.

Luring animals 

The kind of katajjaq mentioned above, which mimics the cry of geese, shows some similarities with the practice of the hunters to lure game.

Some Inuit used a tool (shaped like a claw) to scratch the ice of the frozen sea in order to attract seals.

See also 

 Onomatopoeia
 Prehistoric music
 Vocal learning
 Pishing - imitation of bird sounds by birdwatchers

Notes

References 

  Translation of the original: 
 
 
  The book has been translated to English: 
  The title means “Shamans in Eurasia”, the book is published also in German, Estonian and Finnish. Site of publisher with short description on the book (in Hungarian).
 
 
 . The songs are online available from the ethnopoetics website curated by Jerome Rothenberg.
 
 
  The title means: “The magic drum and the clairvoyant women. Sami folktales”, the series means: “Tales of folks”.

External links 

 
 
  Translated from Russian by Lygia O'Riordan.

Semiotics
Zoomusicology
Ethnomusicology
Onomatopoeia
Phonaesthetics